Inoderma is a genus of lichen-forming fungi in the family Arthoniaceae. It was resurrected for use in 2015 for a small group of species with the following features: elevated, white pruinose pycnidia, immersed to adnate white pruinose apothecia, and a weakly gelatinized hymenium. Inoderma byssaceum was assigned as the type species for the genus.

Species

Inoderma afromontanum  – Uganda
Inoderma byssaceum 
Inoderma epigaeum 
Inoderma nipponicum  – Japan
Inoderma sorediatum  – Poland
Inoderma subabietinum  – Europe

References

Arthoniomycetes
Arthoniomycetes genera
Lichen genera
Taxa described in 1810
Taxa named by Erik Acharius